The boys' 77 kg weightlifting event was the fourth men's event at the weightlifting competition at the 2010 Summer Youth Olympics, with competitors up to 77 kg. The whole competition took place on August 18 at 11:00.

Each lifter performed both the snatch and clean and jerk lifts, with the final score being the sum of the lifter's best result in each. Each athlete received three attempts in each of the two lifts; the score which the lifter received is the heaviest weight successfully lifted within the three allowed attempts.

Medalists

Results

References
 Results

Weightlifting at the 2010 Summer Youth Olympics